Louis Jolliet (September 21, 1645after May 1700) was a French-Canadian explorer known for his discoveries in North America. In 1673, Jolliet and Jacques Marquette, a Jesuit Catholic priest and missionary, were the first non-Natives to explore and map the Upper Mississippi River.

Early life
Jolliet was born in 1645 in Beaupré, a French settlement near Quebec City, to Jean Jolliet and Marie D'Abancourt. When he was six years old, his father died; his mother then married a successful merchant, Geoffroy Guillot dit Lavalle, until his death in 1665. Shortly after the passing of his mother's second husband, she was married to Martin Prevost until her death in 1678. Jolliet's stepfather owned land on the Ile d'Orleans, an island in the Saint Lawrence River in Quebec that was home to First Nations. Jolliet spent much time on Ile d'Orleans, so it was likely that he began speaking Indigenous languages of the Americas at a young age. Besides French, he also learned English and Spanish. During his childhood, Quebec was the center of the French fur trade. The Natives were part of day-to-day life in Quebec, and Joliet grew up knowing a lot about them. Jolliet entered a Jesuit school in Quebec as a child and focused on philosophical and religious studies, aiming for priesthood. He also studied music, becoming a skilled harpsichordist and church organist. He received Holy Orders in 1662 but abandoned his plans to become a priest, leaving the seminary in 1667 to pursue fur trading instead.

Exploration of the Upper Mississippi

While Hernando de Soto was the first European to make official note of the Mississippi River by discovering its southern entrance in 1541, Jolliet and Marquette were the first to locate its upper reaches, and travel most of its length, about 130 years later. De Soto had named the river Rio del Espiritu Santo, but tribes along its length called it variations "Mississippi", meaning "Great River" in the Algonquian languages.

On May 17, 1673, Jolliet and Marquette departed from St. Ignace, Michigan, with two canoes and five other voyageurs of French-Indian ancestry. The group sailed to Green Bay. They then paddled upstream (southward) on the Fox River to the site now known as Portage, Wisconsin. There, they portaged a distance of slightly less than two miles through marsh and oak forest to the Wisconsin River. Europeans eventually built a trading post at that shortest convenient portage between the Great Lakes and Mississippi River basins. On June 17, the canoeists ventured onto the Mississippi River near present-day Prairie du Chien, Wisconsin.

The Jolliet-Marquette expedition paddled along the west bank of the Mississippi until mid-July. When they passed the mouth of the Arkansas River, they became satisfied that they had established that the Mississippi flowed into the Gulf of Mexico. By this point, they had encountered natives carrying European goods and worried about a possible hostile encounter with explorers or colonists from Spain. The voyageurs then followed the Mississippi back to the mouth of the Illinois River, which friendly natives told them was a shorter route back to the Great Lakes. Following the Illinois river upstream, they then turned up its tributary the Des Plaines River near modern-day Joliet, Illinois. They then continued up the Des Plaines River and portaged their canoes and gear at the Chicago Portage. They then followed the Chicago River downstream until they reached Lake Michigan near the location of modern-day Chicago. Father Marquette stayed at the mission of St. Francis Xavier at the southern end of Green Bay, which they reached in August. Joliet returned to Quebec to relate the news of their discoveries. On his way through the Lachine Rapids, Jolliet's canoe overturned and his records were lost. His brief narrative, written from memory, is in essential agreement with Marquette's, the chief account of the journey.

Later years
Jolliet married Claire-Françoise Byssot de la Valtrie. Like Jolliet, she was Canadian born, a daughter of Francois Byssot de la Riviere and his wife Marie Couillard. Claire Francoise was also a sister of Louise Byssot de la Valtrie, wife of Seraphin de Margane, Seigneur de la Valtrie. In 1680, Jolliet was granted the Island of Antwhere by Louis XIV as a reward, where he created a fort and maintained soldiers. In 1693, he was appointed "Royal Hydrographer", and on April 30, 1697, he was granted a seigneury southwest of Quebec City which he named Jolliest.

In 1694, he sailed from the Gulf of St. Lawrence north along the coast of Labrador as far north as Zoar, a voyage of five and a half months. He recorded details of the country, navigation, the Inuit and their customs. His journal ("Journal de Louis Jolliet allant à la decouverte de Labrador, 1694,") is the earliest known detailed survey of the Labrador coast from the Strait of Belle Isle to Zoar.

In May 1700, Louis Jolliet left for Anticosti Island.  He then disappears from the historical record.  There is no listing of his death or burial place, and the sole record of his fate is the notation that a mass for his soul was said in Quebec on September 15, 1700.

Legacy

Jolliet's main legacy is most tangible in the Midwestern United States and Quebec, mostly through geographical names, including the cities of Joliet, Illinois; Joliet, Montana; and Joliette, Quebec (founded by one of Jolliet's descendants, Barthélemy Joliette).

The several variations in the spelling of the name "Jolliet" reflect spelling that occurred at times when illiteracy or poor literacy was common and spelling was unstandardized. Jolliet's descendants live throughout eastern Canada and the United States. The Louis Jolliet rose, developed by Agriculture and Agri-Food Canada, was named in his honor.

The Jolliet Squadron of cadets at the Royal Military College Saint-Jean in the Province of Quebec was named in his honor. A street and subway station in Montreal, Quebec are named after him. Joliet Junior College in Joliet, Illinois, is named after the explorer, as are numerous high schools in North America.

A cruise ship sailing out of Quebec City is also named in his honour.

Jolliet appears with Pere Jacques Marquette SJ on a 1968 United States postage stamp honoring their exploratory voyage.

Joliet also has a mall named after him, the Louis Joliet mall in Joliet, Illinois, United States.

See also
French colonization of the Americas

Notes

References

Further reading
 Delanglez, Jean. Life and Voyages of Louis Jolliet (1645-1700). Chicago: Loyola University, 1948.
 Eifert, Virginia S. Louis Jolliet, Explorer of Rivers. New York: Dodd, Mead, 1961.
 Scanlon, Marion S. Trails of the French Explorers. San Antonio: The Naylor Company, 1956.

External links

Jolliet 1645-1700
Biography at the Dictionary of Canadian Biography Online
 David Joseph Marcou's earliest version of his historical report posted on the La Crosse History Unbound website re: Louis Joliet & Fr. Marquette's expedition from Green Bay to the mouth of the Arkansas River in 1673, hence becoming the 1st white men to see the upper Mississippi River (at present-day Prairie du Chien, WI), the mouth of the Missouri River, & the sites of what would become St. Louis, Mo, & Chicago, IL. Later, Marcou would expand his report, after he'd confirmed Joliet, not Marquette, led the expedition, & that Joliet also funded it. After the two returned north & Fr. Marquette passed, Joliet was gifted with the world's largest privately-held island then, Anticosti near Quebec City, by King Louis XIV (Sun King). Louis XIV had hesitated in pre-funding the risky expedition, which Marcou has since termed "The First North American Corps of Discovery". The report's 2nd part covers the archivally-proven direct bloodline between Louis Joliet & Marcou's immediate family. Joliet's granddaughter Madeleine-Marie Joliet Anticosti's 2nd marriage was to Jean Marcoux, in that direct-line.

1645 births
1700 deaths
Date of death unknown
17th-century explorers
Canadian explorers
Explorers of Canada
French explorers of North America
Explorers of the United States
People of Louisiana (New France)
People of New France
People of pre-statehood Illinois
People of pre-statehood Michigan
People of pre-statehood Wisconsin
Persons of National Historic Significance (Canada)
Canadian people of French descent
Jacques Marquette